Gad Machnes (גד מכנס; born 8 June 1956) is a retired Israeli footballer.

Soccer career
Machnes played as a defender for Maccabi Netanya, Maccabi Petah Tikva (loan), Hapoel Tel Aviv, Maccabi Petah Tikva, Hapoel Hadera, and Beitar Netanya. He earned a gold medal playing for Team Israel at the 1977 Maccabiah Games. He also played 21 caps for the Israel national football team from 1978-85.

He worked as the manager of Beitar Tubruk in Liga Gimel.

Honours

National
Israeli Premier League (4):
1973–74, 1977–78, 1979–80, 1982–83
State Cup (1):
1978
Israeli Supercup (3):
1978, 1980, 1983
League Cup (2):
1982–83, 1983–84

International
UEFA Intertoto Cup (3):
1978, 1980, 1983

Personal life
Gad's twin brother Oded was a striker and both played together in Maccabi Netanya and in Maccabi Petah Tikva. His great-uncle was Israeli politician Gad Machnes, for whom he was named.

References

1956 births
Living people
Beitar Nes Tubruk F.C.
Competitors at the 1977 Maccabiah Games
Israeli Jews
Israeli footballers
Israel international footballers
Israeli twins
Twin sportspeople
Maccabi Netanya F.C. players
Maccabi Petah Tikva F.C. players
Maccabiah Games gold medalists for Israel
Maccabiah Games medalists in football
Hapoel Tel Aviv F.C. players
Hapoel Hadera F.C. players
Beitar Netanya F.C. players
Footballers from Netanya
Association football defenders